Lisa Brooks is an historian, writer, and professor of English and American studies at Amherst College in Massachusetts where she specializes in the history of Native American and European interactions from the American colonial period to the present.

Brooks is of Abenaki and Polish heritage and received her B.A. at Goddard College (1993) and her M.A. at Boston College (1995) and Ph.D. at the Cornell University (2004). She is the author of many articles, essays and popular books including,  The Common Pot: The Recovery of Native Space in the Northeast, (2008)  and Our Beloved Kin (2018). Brooks taught at Harvard University before moving to teach at Amherst College. Brooks teaches several classes on "Native American & Indigenous studies, early American literature, contemporary literature, and comparative American Studies" In 2019, Our Beloved Kin was one of the winners of the Bancroft Prize.

Works
Our beloved kin : a new history of King Philip's War, New Haven ; London : Yale University Press, 2018.  
 The Common Pot: The Recovery of Native Space in the Northeast, Minneapolis : University of Minnesota Press, 2008.

References

External links
Faculty page

Amherst College faculty
Cornell University alumni
Boston College alumni
Living people
21st-century American historians
Historians of the United States
Year of birth missing (living people)
Native American writers
Goddard College alumni
Abenaki people
Bancroft Prize winners